Norman Alexander Malcolm (born 19 March 1955) is a Jamaican cricket umpire.

Umpiring career
Malcolm made his list A cricket umpiring debut in 1993, making his first-class cricket debut the following year.

See also
 List of One Day International cricket umpires
 List of Twenty20 International cricket umpires

References

1955 births
Living people
Jamaican cricket umpires
West Indian One Day International cricket umpires
West Indian Twenty20 International cricket umpires